Psilachnum is a genus of fungi within the Hyaloscyphaceae family. The genus contains 27 species.

References

External links
Psilachnum at Index Fungorum

Hyaloscyphaceae